Xenonectriella nephromatis is a species of lichenicolous fungus in the family Nectriaceae. Found in Alaska, it was described as a species new to science in 2020 by Sergio Pérez-Ortega. The type specimen was discovered in the Hoonah–Angoon Census Area in Glacier Bay National Park, where it was growing on a Nephroma lichen. The specific epithet alludes to this host lichen.

The fungus has perithecioid ascocarps, meaning that they are spherical or flask-shaped with a central pore (ostiole) through which spores are discharged. These dark red ascocarps, which are immersed in the thallus of the host lichen, are up to 0.6 mm in diameter. The asci are eight-spored and measure 120–130 by 8–12 μm. Ascospores are more or less broadly ellipsoid, with some variation in shape, and measure 12–16 by 5–8 μm.

References

Nectriaceae
Fungi described in 2020
Fungi of the United States
Lichenicolous fungi
Fungi without expected TNC conservation status